is a railway station in Suzuka, Mie Prefecture, Japan, operated by Ise Railway. The station is 9.1 rail kilometers from the terminus of the line at Kawarada Station. As its name suggests, it is the nearest station to Suzuka Circuit, located 25 minutes away from the station on foot.

History
The Ise Line was privatized on March 27, 1987 and the name changed to the present name, four days before the dissolution of the JNR on April 1, 1987.

Line
Ise Railway
Ise Line

Station layout
Suzuka Circuit Inō Station has a two opposed side platforms. The station is unattended except on race dates of the Suzuka Circuit.

Platforms

Adjacent stations 

|-
!colspan=5|Ise Railway

External links

 Official home page 

Railway stations in Japan opened in 1973
Railway stations in Mie Prefecture